Bamda is a small township in Markam County in the south-east of the Tibet Autonomous Region of China, roughly  from Lhasa. It is basically an army garrison with a small Tibetan village around the corner.

Footnotes

See also
List of towns and villages in Tibet Autonomous Region

Populated places in Nyingchi